Hayat El Garaa (born 2 March 1996) is a Moroccan para-athlete who specializes in throwing events. She represented Morocco at the Paralympic Games.

Career
El Garaa represented Morocco in the women's shot put F41 event at the 2016 Summer Paralympics and finished in seventh place with a throw of 6.97 metres. She again represented Morocco in the women's discus throw F41 event at the 2020 Summer Paralympics and won a bronze medal.

Personal life
Her sisters Najat and Laila are both Paralympic medalists.

References

1996 births
Living people
Paralympic athletes of Morocco
Moroccan female discus throwers
Moroccan female shot putters
Athletes (track and field) at the 2016 Summer Paralympics
Athletes (track and field) at the 2020 Summer Paralympics
Medalists at the 2020 Summer Paralympics
Paralympic bronze medalists for Morocco
Paralympic medalists in athletics (track and field)
20th-century Moroccan women
21st-century Moroccan women